Climax is a village in the Canadian province of Saskatchewan within the Rural Municipality of Lone Tree No. 18 and Census Division No. 4. The village is located in the southwestern region of the province, just north of the U.S. border, situated on Highway 18 between Frontier and Canuck and on Highway 37 between Shaunavon and the Port of Climax.

History 
Climax incorporated as a village on December 11, 1923. The community was named after Climax, Minnesota, the home town of early homesteader Christ Fuglestad.

Demographics 

Notable people

Willie Desjardins, former head coach of the Vancouver Canucks.
Gord Kluzak, former NHL ice hockey player (1982-1991)

See also

 List of communities in Saskatchewan
 Villages of Saskatchewan

References

Villages in Saskatchewan
Lone Tree No. 18, Saskatchewan
Division No. 4, Saskatchewan